Tingena serena is a species of moth in the family Oecophoridae. It is endemic to New Zealand and has been observed in Southland and Dunedin. The adults of this species are on the wing in December and January.

Taxonomy 
This species was first described by Alfred Philpott using specimens collected in bush on a hillside in January at Waiau River at Sunnyside in Southland. Philpott originally named the species Borkhausenia serena. In that publication Philpott also studied and illustrated the genitalia of the male of this species. George Hudson discussed this species in his 1928 book The butterflies and moths of New Zealand under that name. In 1988 J. S. Dugdale synonymised B. comosaris with B. serena and then placed B. serena in the genus Tingena. The male holotype specimen is held in the New Zealand Arthropod Collection.

Description

Philpott described this species as follows:

Distribution
This species is endemic to New Zealand. This species has been observed in Southland and Dunedin.

Behaviour 
The adults of this species is on the wing in December and January.

References

Oecophoridae
Moths of New Zealand
Moths described in 1926
Endemic fauna of New Zealand
Taxa named by Alfred Philpott
Endemic moths of New Zealand